Talking Saul is a live talk show hosted by Chris Hardwick that discussed episodes of the AMC television series Better Call Saul, that aired from February 15, 2016 to August 8, 2022. Guests featured on the show included cast and crew members from Better Call Saul.

Broadcast and format 
The show uses the same format as Talking Dead and Talking Bad, other aftershows hosted by Hardwick. AMC announced that Talking Saul would air after the second season Better Call Saul premiere on February 15, 2016, and again after the second-season finale on April 18, 2016. It returned following the season 3 premiere and finale. 

The show did not return for Better Call Sauls fourth and fifth season, with no word from AMC on its status. This caused some to believe the show was cancelled. 

Talking Saul resumed airing for the mid-season finale and the penultimate episode of Better Call Sauls sixth season, with Hardwick returning as host.

Episodes

Season 1 (2016)

Season 2 (2017)

Season 3 (2022)

See also
 Talking Bad – a similar talk show hosted by Hardwick which discusses Breaking Bad final eight episodes.
 Talking Dead – a similar talk show hosted by Hardwick which discusses episodes of The Walking Dead and Fear the Walking Dead.
 Talking Preacher – a similar talk show hosted by Hardwick which discusses select episodes of Preacher.
 Talking with Chris Hardwick – a similar talk show hosted by Hardwick that features him interviewing guests from the world of pop culture.

References

External links 
 

Better Call Saul
2016 American television series debuts
2022 American television series endings
AMC (TV channel) original programming
Aftershows
Television series by Embassy Row (production company)
2010s American television talk shows
2020s American television talk shows